Ngọc Hà may refer to several places in Vietnam, including:

Ngọc Hà, Hanoi, a ward of Ba Đình District
, a ward of Hà Giang

See also
Hồ Ngọc Hà, a Vietnamese model, pop singer, actress and entertainer.